The Hill of Allen (Cnoc Alúine in Modern Irish, earlier Cnoc Almaine; also Hill of Almu ) is a volcanic hill situated in the west of County Kildare, Ireland, beside the village of Allen. According to Irish Mythology it was the seat of the hunter-warrior Fionn mac Cumhaill and the Fianna. The site is currently part-owned by Roadstone Dublin Limited and extensive quarrying has noticeably changed the profile of the hill.

History
The hill is situated at the easternmost point of the Bog of Allen and it is from this hill that the bog gets its name. According to legend, Fionn mac Cumhaill had a fortress on the hill and used the surrounding flatlands as training grounds for his warriors. In 722 A.D. the Battle of Allen was fought between the Leinstermen (Laigin), led by Murchad mac Brain Mut (King of Leinster), and the forces of Fergal mac Máele Dúin (High King of Ireland) in close proximity to the hill.

Tower
In 1859 Sir Gerard George Aylmer, the 9th Baronet of Donadea began building a circular tower on the top of the hill, which was completed in 1863. The tower was a folly and the names of the workmen are inscribed on the steps.

During the construction of the tower a large coffin containing human bones was unearthed which were said to be those of Fionn mac Cumhaill. These were re-interred under the site.

Quarry
As of 2008 most of the site is under the ownership of Roadstone Dublin Limited and much of the western side of the hill has been quarried.
An agreement between Roadstone Dublin Limited and Kildare County Council allows quarrying to be carried out (subject to conditions) for a period of 50 years from 15 October 2008

See also
 Fionn mac Cumhaill
 Bog of Allen
 Allen, County Kildare
Dún Ailinne
 List of mountains in Ireland

References and notes

External links
 Hill of Allen Action Group

Mountains and hills of County Kildare
Archaeological sites in County Kildare
Surface mines in the Republic of Ireland
Volcanism of the Republic of Ireland
Pre-Holocene volcanism
Extinct volcanism